The Battle of Tuyutí was an engagement during the Paraguayan War (1864–1870) between Paraguay and the Triple Alliance of Brazil, Argentina and Uruguay. It was fought on May 24, 1866, with the forces aligned as follows:

Abbreviations used

Military rank
 Gen = General
 BG = Brigadier general
 Col = Colonel
 Ltc = Lieutenant colonel

Paraguayan Army

Imperial Brazilian Army
Gen. Manuel Luís Osório

Argentine Army
Gen. Bartolomé Mitre

I Army Corps
Gen. Wenceslao Paunero

II Army Corps
Gen. Juan Andrés Gelly y Obes

National Army of Uruguay

References

Orders of battle